Then Sindhudhe Vaanam is a 1975 Indian Tamil-language film starring Sivakumar and Kamal Haasan. It was directed by Ra. Sankaran and produced by V.C. Ganesan. V. Kumar composed the soundtrack. It was released on 11 April 1975, in the week of Puthandu.

Plot

Cast 
 Sivakumar as Raja
 Kamal Haasan as Ravi
 Jayachitra as Lalli
 Rani Chandra as Rama
 Srikanth as Gopi
 Cho Ramaswamy as Pavadai
 Manorama as Muthamma
 K. A. Thangavelu as Singaram Pillai
 Neelu as 'Lawyer' Kundu Kunchumani Iyer
 Major Sundarrajan as Ramalinga Pillai (Guest appearance)
 Sukumari as Bangajam
 S. N. Lakshmi as Annamma
 Vijaya Chandrika
 C. R. Parthiban

Soundtrack 
The music was composed by V. Kumar and lyrics were written by Vaali. Ilaiyaraaja worked as a session guitarist in the song "Unnidam Mayangugiren". Kamal Haasan worked as choreographer in the song 'Yezhuthatha Paadal'.

References

External links 
 

1970s Tamil-language films
1975 films
Indian black-and-white films